is Japanese R&B singer Misia's second single, released on May 21, 1998. It debuted on the weekly Oricon singles chart at #15 with 31,450 copies sold. Four weeks later, the single climbed to its peak at #9.

"Hi no Ataru Basho" was the theme song to the movie 'Hood, as well as the NTV program Docchi no Ryōri Show. The b-side, "Koisuru Kisetsu", was used in an Elleseine cosmetics commercial and served as opening theme to the TV Tokyo program Break Beats.

Track list

Charts

Oricon Sales Chart

External links
Misia Official Web Site

1998 singles
Misia songs
Songs written by Misia
Song recordings produced by Jun Sasaki